Meleneta antennata is a species of moth in the family Noctuidae (the owlet moths). It is found in North America.

The MONA or Hodges number for Meleneta antennata is 9191.

References

Further reading

 
 
 

Pantheinae
Articles created by Qbugbot
Moths described in 1908